The Anthology is a compilation album by the British hard rock band Deep Purple, containing material by Mks I (1968–1969), II (1969–1973), III (1973–1975) and IV (1975–1976) line-ups. It was released as a double vinyl album and double-cassette, and included a few previously-unreleased tracks and mixes. The sleeve-notes were written by Chris Charlesworth, author of Deep Purple – The Illustrated Biography.

This compilation was never re-issued on CD: a 2-CD set, released by EMI in 1991, was also titled 'Anthology', but featured different songs and only previously-released material.

Track listing

1985 vinyl version 
Side one
 "Hush" (Joe South) – 4:24
 "Emmaretta" (Jon Lord, Ritchie Blackmore, Rod Evans) – 4:28
 "Hallelujah" (Roger Greenaway, Roger Cook) – 3:42
 "Shadows" (Blackmore, Lord, Evans, Nick Simper, Ian Paice) – 3:29 (Previously unreleased track from the Shades of Deep Purple sessions in 1968)
 "Love Help Me" (Blackmore, Evans) – 3:23 (Previously unreleased instrumental version)
 "Wring That Neck" (Lord, Blackmore, Simper, Paice) – 4:12

Side two
 "Speed King" (Blackmore, Ian Gillan, Roger Glover, Lord, Paice) – 6:53
 "Black Night" (Blackmore, Gillan, Glover, Lord, Paice) – 3:27
 "Grabsplatter" (Blackmore, Gillan, Glover, Lord, Paice) – 4:34 (Instrumental jam from a BBC session in 1970)
 "Child in Time" (Edited version) (Blackmore, Gillan, Glover, Lord, Paice) – 9:16

Side three
 "Strange Kind of Woman" (Blackmore, Gillan, Glover, Lord, Paice) – 4:50
 "Freedom" (Blackmore, Gillan, Glover, Lord, Paice) – 3:31 (Previously unreleased track from the Fireball sessions in 1971)
 "Fireball" (Blackmore, Gillan, Glover, Lord, Paice) – 3:24
 "Highway Star" (Blackmore, Gillan, Glover, Lord, Paice) – 6:07
 "Never Before" (Blackmore, Gillan, Glover, Lord, Paice) – 4:00 (A different (quadrophonic) mix, than the ordinary album version)
 "When a Blind Man Cries" (Blackmore, Gillan, Glover, Lord, Paice) – 2:30

Side four
 "Smoke on the Water" (Blackmore, Gillan, Glover, Lord, Paice) – 6:38 (A different (quadrophonic) mix, than the ordinary album version)
 "Woman from Tokyo" (Blackmore, Gillan, Glover, Lord, Paice) – 5:49
 "Might Just Take Your Life" (Blackmore, Lord, Paice, David Coverdale) – 4.39
 "Coronarias Redig" (Blackmore, Lord, Paice) – 4:51
 "Soldier of Fortune" (Blackmore, Coverdale) – 3:15
 "You Keep on Moving" (Coverdale, Glenn Hughes) – 4:17

1991 CD version
CD one
 "Hush" – 4:25
 "Mandrake Root" (Blackmore, Evans, Lord) – 6:08
 "Shield" (Lord, Blackmore, Evans) – 6:03
 "Wring That Neck" – 5:13
 "The Bird Has Flown" (Evans, Backmore, Lord) – 5:36
 "Bloodsucker" (Blackmore, Gillan, Glover, Lord, Paice) – 4:08
 "Speed King" – 5:53
 "Black Night" – 3:27
 "Child in Time" – 10:16
 "Fireball" – 3:23
 "Strange Kind of Woman" – 8:35 (Live version taken from Deep Purple in Concert, 1980)
 "No One Came" (Blackmore, Gillan, Glover, Lord, Paice) – 6:25
 "Highway Star" – 6:06

CD two
 "Smoke on the Water" – 7:01 (live version taken from Made in Japan, 1972)
 "Pictures of Home" – 5:03
 "Woman from Tokyo" – 5:50
 "Smooth Dancer" (Blackmore, Gillan, Glover, Lord, Paice) – 4:09
 "Sail Away" (Blackmore, Lord, Paice, Coverdale) – 5:48
 "Lay Down Stay Down" (Blackmore, Lord, Paice, Coverdale) – 4:15
 "Burn" (Blackmore, Lord, Paice, Coverdale) – 6:50 (Live version taken from Live in London, 1982)
 "Stormbringer" (Blackmore, Coverdale) – 4:05
 "Hold On" (Coverdale, Hughes, Lord, Paice) – 5:05
 "Gypsy" (Blackmore, Lord, Paice, Coverdale, Hughes) – 4:13
 "Mistreated" (Blackmore, Coverdale) – 11:40 (Live version taken from Made in Europe, 1976)
 "Gettin' Tighter" (Tommy Bolin, Hughes) – 3:36
 "Love Child" (Bolin, Coverdale) – 3:05
 "You Keep on Moving" – 5:18

Credits

Deep Purple
Mk. I
 Ritchie Blackmore – guitar
 Rod Evans – lead vocals
 Jon Lord – organ, keyboards, backing vocals
 Ian Paice – drums
 Nick Simper – bass, backing vocals

Mk. II
 Ritchie Blackmore – lead guitar
 Ian Gillan – vocals
 Roger Glover – bass
 Jon Lord – organ, keyboards
 Ian Paice – drums

Mk. III
 Ritchie Blackmore – lead guitar
 David Coverdale – vocals
 Glenn Hughes – bass guitar, vocals
 Jon Lord – organ, keyboards
 Ian Paice – drums

Mk. IV
 Tommy Bolin: Guitar and vocals.
 David Coverdale: Lead vocals
 Glenn Hughes: Bass and vocals
 Jon Lord: Keyboards
 Ian Paice: Drums

Production credits
 Digitally remastered at Abbey Road Studios, London by Peter Vince
 Photography: Fin Costello and Richard Imrie

Charts

References

1985 compilation albums
Harvest Records compilation albums
Deep Purple compilation albums
EMI Records compilation albums